George Willard Little (born June 27, 1963) is a former American football defensive lineman who played three seasons with the Miami Dolphins of the National Football League (NFL). He was drafted by the Dolphins in the third round of the 1985 NFL Draft. He played college football at the University of Iowa and attended Duquesne High School in Duquesne, Pennsylvania. Little was also a member of the Montreal Machine of the World League of American Football.

References

External links
Just Sports Stats

Living people
1963 births
Players of American football from Pennsylvania
American football defensive ends
African-American players of American football
Iowa Hawkeyes football players
Miami Dolphins players
Montreal Machine players
People from Duquesne, Pennsylvania
21st-century African-American people
20th-century African-American sportspeople